Trinity Racing is a British multi-discipline cycling team, that competes in the road, cyclo-cross and mountain bike racing disciplines of the sport. It was founded in 2018 as a primarily cyclo-cross team, before expanding into road cycling in 2020, and mountain biking in 2021.

Team roster

Road

Cyclo-cross

Mountain biking

Major wins
2020
 Overall Giro Ciclistico d'Italia, Tom Pidcock
Stages 4, 7, & 8, Tom Pidcock
Stage 4 Ronde de l'Isard, Ben Healy
2021
Stage 2 Tour d'Eure-et-Loir, Luke Lamperti
Stage 10 Giro Ciclistico d'Italia, Ben Healy
 National Criterium Championships, Luke Lamperti
2022
Tour de Taiwan
Points classification, Luke Lamperti
Mountains classification, Sam Culverwell
Stage 3, Luke Lamperti

National champions 
2021
 American criterium, Luke Lamperti

References

External links
 

Cycling teams established in 2018
Cycling teams based in the United Kingdom
UCI Continental Teams (Europe)